Julian Ward Snow, Baron Burntwood (24 February 1910 – 24 January 1982) was a British Labour Party politician. He was a Member of Parliament for Portsmouth Central from 1945. When that constituency was abolished he represented Lichfield and Tamworth from 1950 until stepping down at the 1970 general election, when his seat was won for the Conservatives by James d'Avigdor-Goldsmid. After his retirement he was created a life peer on 21 September 1970 as Baron Burntwood, of Burntwood in the County of Stafford.

During his time as an MP, Snow also served as Parliamentary Secretary to the Ministry of Health. He never made a speech from the backbenches, although he did speak in his role as Vice Chamberlain of the Household.

Lord Burntwood was employed by Dunlop Rubber Co. Ltd in India and East Africa in 1930–1937.  He joined the Royal Artillery in 1939 and served till the end of World War II. He married the artist Flavia Blois, daughter of Sir Ralph Barrett MacNaghten Blois, 9th Bt. and Winifred Grace Hegan Kennard, on 20 August 1948.

Lord Burntwood was a founding member and the first chairman of The Institution of Environmental Sciences, which holds the annual Burntwood Lecture in his memory.

References

External links 
 

1910 births
1982 deaths
Labour Party (UK) MPs for English constituencies
Burntwood
UK MPs 1945–1950
UK MPs 1950–1951
UK MPs 1951–1955
UK MPs 1955–1959
UK MPs 1959–1964
UK MPs 1964–1966
UK MPs 1966–1970
UK MPs who were granted peerages
Ministers in the Attlee governments, 1945–1951
Ministers in the Wilson governments, 1964–1970
British Army personnel of World War II
Royal Artillery personnel
Life peers created by Elizabeth II